The Best of Tommy James and The Shondells is the second compilation album by Tommy James and the Shondells and was released in 1969.  It reached #21 on the Billboard 200.

One single was released from the album, "Ball of Fire", which reached #19 on the Billboard Hot 100.

Track listing

Personnel
Vocals: Tommy James
Guitar: Eddie Gray
Bass: Mike Vale
Organ: Ronnie Rosman
Drums: Peter Lucia

Charts
Album

Singles

References

1969 albums
Tommy James and the Shondells albums
Roulette Records albums